Diplomatic relations between the People's Republic of China and the Republic of Burundi were established on December 21, 1963, under Chairman Mao Zedong and King Mwambutsa IV Bangiriceng, respectively.  King Mwambutsa broke off diplomatic relations with China in 1965, although they were restored under Michel Micombero the first President of Burundi, on October 31, 1971. Since then, China has provided development aid to Burundi, including helping with the construction of a textiles mill in Bujumbura. As of 2002, China exported $2.718 worth of goods, while importing only $491,000 worth of goods from Burundi. The current Chinese ambassador to Burundi is Feng Zhijun.

Burundi was one of 53 countries, that in June 2020, backed the Hong Kong national security law at the United Nations.

Economic Development 
Since the first Forum on China Africa Cooperation in 2000, Beijing has delivered over $164 million in Official Development Assistance to Burundi. This amount includes funds for the construction of a presidential palace, $9 million for construction of a hospital in Bubanza Province, and three debt cancellation agreements.

References 

 
China
Bilateral relations of China
Africa–China relations